Chicago Assembly (sometimes referred to as Torrence Avenue Assembly) is currently Ford Motor Company's oldest continuously operated automobile manufacturing plant.  It is located at E. 130th Street and Torrence Avenue in the Hegewisch section of Chicago, Illinois.  Chicago Assembly currently builds the sixth-generation Ford Explorer and the second-generation Lincoln Aviator.

History
Production started on March 3, 1924, as an alternative production site for the Model T to the River Rouge Plant. It switched to Model A production in 1928, and built M8 Greyhound and M20 Armored Utility Car armored cars during World War II. It was the site of pickup truck production for 40 years before that operation stopped in 1964. In 1985, it was selected as the site of production for the Ford Taurus and Mercury Sable midsize sedans.

Ford spent $400,000,000 in 2004 to modernize the plant. It switched to production of D3-platform vehicles for 2005, and to CD6-platform vehicles for 2020. Nine automotive suppliers have built factories nearby at the Ford Chicago Manufacturing Campus developed by CenterPoint Properties. Ford's Chicago plant is a center for flexible just-in-time production. It employs over 4,099 workers.

Products made (model years)
Lincoln Aviator (2020–present)
Ford Explorer (2011–present)

Past (model years)
Lincoln MKS (2009–2016)
Ford Taurus X (2008–2009)
Mercury Montego (2005–2007)
Ford Freestyle (2005–2007)
Ford Five Hundred (2005–2007)
Ford Taurus (1986–2019)
Mercury Sable (1986–2009)
Mercury Marquis (1983–1986)
Ford LTD (1983–1986)
Mercury Cougar (1981–1982)
Ford Granada (1981–1982)
Ford Thunderbird (1977–1981)
Ford Torino (1976)
Ford Elite (1974-1976)
Mercury Marquis (1969–1976)
Ford Galaxie (1969–1976)
Ford Country Sedan (1952-1974)
Ford Country Squire (1950-1991)
Ford Deluxe (1941-1948)
Ford Custom (1949-1951)
Ford Crestline (1951-1954)
Ford Fairlane (1955-1961)
Ford F-100 (1953–1964)
Ford Model A (1927–1931)
Ford Model T (1924–1928)

See also
 List of Ford factories

References

External links
Map: 

Ford factories
Motor vehicle assembly plants in Illinois
Buildings and structures in Chicago
Companies based in Chicago